Kattappanayile Rithwik Roshan is a 2016 Indian Malayalam-language romantic-comedy drama film directed by Nadirshah. It stars Vishnu Unnikrishnan, 
Lijomol Jose and Prayaga Martin. 

The film was released worldwide on 18 November 2016 and was one of the biggest  blockbuster hit Malayalam films of 2016 at box office.

Plot
The film tells the story of Krishnan Nair a.k.a. Kichu who got a chance as a child artist and makes up his ambition to be a super star in the industry though in his adulthood he becomes a typecast with small and similar roles he performed in his childhood.

Ann Mariya is a newcomer to Kattappana and becomes friends with Kichu quickly, believing him to be connected with the film industry on seeing a photograph of him standing next to Priyadarshan at a local studio. Kichu mistakes her boundless closeness to be love and when he sees her with her college senior Amith  and confronts her, he feels shattered. Amith's mother tongue is Hindi and Amith cannot understand Malayalam.
The same day Kichu has a film shoot where the director James Antony takes a chance with him believing him to be apt for portraying the central character of his new venture. But the producer, being a newbie is not ready to risk it all and so Kichu had to forfeit the part. 

Returning home, he faces yet another problem where two girls whom he sent to a nearby film location were mistreated, one being his neighbor's daughter, Kani. Kichu's neighbor presumes that Kichu sent them to the location with intentions for his personal gain. His father beats and kicks him out of the house. Kichu, out of despair, decides to commit suicide. 

As he is about to commit suicide by jumping off a cliff, a car drives towards him (actually towards the suicide point). In an attempt by the driver to prevent his car from hitting Kichu, the car drifts and tumbles over near the suicide point. The person happens to be Amith, who is also the owner of a start-up. Kichu rescues Amith and reckons suicide is not an answer to problems. Amith does not tell Kichu the reason behind Amith's suicide attempt and the reason is not revealed to the audience either. Geo's girlfriend Neethu had abandoned Geo for Amith, when Neethu received a marriage proposal from Amith. Geo who comes to the suicide point with the intention of committing suicide. Geo reads Kichu's suicide note describing his story and has a change of heart (decides to stay alive) and decides to meet Kichu. 

In the present, Kichu has acknowledged Kani's love for him. He remains friends with Ann and has overcome his inferiority complexes. Kichu, Kani and Ann attends the wedding of Amith with Neethu, where Kichu understands that Amith and Ann are not in love with each other. Amith and Ann are friends.
Towards the credits, Kichu is called again to don the role of a petty thief in a movie. At the location. However, it turns out that the role is being done by another person and Kichu is actually the hero of the film.

Cast

Vishnu Unnikrishnan as Krishnan Nair (Kichu), a youth who wishes to take career in film but couldn't find chances due to his dark complex, which also makes his father hate him. 
Lijomol Jose as Kanimol, Kichu's neighbour who has an interest in him but is ignored by Kichu. Later they reunite.
Dharmajan Bolgatty as Dasappan (Dasan), friend of Kichu who always supports him .
Prayaga Martin as Ann Maria, love interest of Kichu. Later they become good friends
Siddique as Surendran (Sura), Kichu's father
Salim Kumar as 'Naxalite' Chandran, Kani's father
Dini Daniel as Seema, Kichu's mother 
Siju Wilsson as Geo
Swasika as Neethu
Pradeep Kottayam as Vijayan, Dasappan's father
Rahul Madhav as Giridhar
Kalabhavan Shajon as Director James Antony
Seema G. Nair as Kani's mother
Jaffar Idukki as Tea shop owner
Mahesh as Geo's father
Ambika Mohan as Geo's Mother
Eloor George as Head load worker
Kalabhavan Yousuf as Barber
Kalabhavan Haneef as Sasi (Soman),Head load worker
Samadh as Neethu's relative
Shahanas Muhammed Arafa
Bipin Jose as Amith
Abdul Majeed as Headmaster
Abu Salim as Gym Parlour owner
Nandu Pothuval as Sthiram Vazhipokken
Vinod Kedamangalam as Salesman at Seemas Wedding Collections
Adinad Sasi as Villager
Bineesh Bastin as Sthiram Gunda
Rajesh as Poovalan 1 
Ajoobsha as Poovalan 2
Kevin Mathew as Poovalan 3
N P Suhaid (Kukku)
Bibin George as Naxalite
Kottayam Nazir (Guest Appearance) as Director Ajayan
Nadirshah as director (cameo)
Boban Samuel as director (cameo)
Ancy as Teacher
Asha Aravind as Jessy
Pauly Valsan as Upadeshi thalla
Thara Kalyan as Neethu's relative 
Sethulakshmi as Neethu's relative 
Neena Kurup as Neethu's mother 
Devika Nambiar as Neethu's Friend
Ansiba Hassan as Actress (Guest Appearance)

Music 
Nadirshah composed the music and Bijibal worked on the background score for the film. The lyrics for the four songs is written by SanthoshVarma and B. K. Harinarayanan.

Track listing

Release and reception
The film was originally scheduled for release on 11 November 2016, but due to the unforeseen execution of the 500 and 1000 rupee currency demonetisation, which removed these bank notes from circulation, the release was pushed to 18 November 2016.

Box office
The film was commercial success. It grossed ₹ 24 crores alone from Kerala and ₹ 54 crores from Worldwide box office.

References

External links
 

2016 films
Indian romantic comedy-drama films
2010s Malayalam-language films
Films scored by Nadirshah
Films directed by Nadirshah
2016 romantic comedy-drama films
2016 comedy films
2016 drama films